This is the discography of Andreas Johnson, a Swedish pop rock singer-songwriter, consists of six studio albums, a compilation album, nineteen singles, and eight music videos. In 1996, Johnson signed a recording contract with EMI and released his debut studio album, Cottonfish Tales, in April 1997. Though critically acclaimed, the record was less than a success commercially. The first single released through his new contract with Warner Music Sweden, entitled "Glorious," topped the charts, reaching number three on the Italian Singles Chart, number four on the UK Singles Chart, and number eight on the Billboard's Hot Dance Club Songs. In 2000, "Glorious" received the gold certification by the Swedish Recording Industry Association (GLF) for distribution of over ten thousand singles. Johnson released his second album, Liebling, in May 1999. The album sold 500,000 units and was followed by extensive touring, during which Johnson began work on his third solo record.

Deadly Happy was released in February 2002 and peaked at number 45 on the Sverigetopplistan chart. The second single from the album, "Sing for Me," was certified gold by the GLF. Taking a long break from public commitments, Johnson returned with Mr. Johnson, Your Room Is on Fire in November 2005, generating successful singles like "Show Me Love" and "Sunshine of Mine." He released his first compilation album, The Collector, in March 2007. The Collector is his most successful record to date; it charted on Billboard's European Top 100 Albums and was certified gold by the GLF for distribution of over twenty thousand albums. The compilation generated the gold single "A Little Bit of Love," that peaked at number three on the Sverigetopplistan chart. In 2008, Johnson released his fifth album, Rediscovered, which peaked at number 29 on the Sverigetopplistan chart.

Studio albums 

Notes

A Mr. Johnson, Your Room Is On Fire was re-released with new cover artwork and two new tracks on March 22, 2006.

Compilation albums

Singles 

Notes

See also 
 Carola Häggkvist discography

References

External links
 Official discography
 

Discographies of Swedish artists
Pop music discographies
Rock music discographies

sv:Andreas Johnson#Diskografi